Keith Rayner may refer to:
 Keith Rayner (bishop)
 Keith Rayner (psychologist)